The Wil-Fra-Mar is a historic apartment building located at Indianapolis, Indiana.  It was built in 1897, and is a three-story, six bay wide, yellow brick building.  It has double recessed entries and stripped down Romanesque Revival style details.

It was listed on the National Register of Historic Places in 1983.

References

Apartment buildings in Indiana
Residential buildings on the National Register of Historic Places in Indiana
Romanesque Revival architecture in Indiana
Residential buildings completed in 1897
Residential buildings in Indianapolis
National Register of Historic Places in Indianapolis